In science and engineering, a semi-log plot/graph or semi-logarithmic plot/graph has one axis on a logarithmic scale, the other on a linear scale. It is useful for data with exponential relationships, where one variable covers a large range of values, or to zoom in and visualize that - what seems to be a straight line in the beginning - is in fact the slow start of a logarithmic curve that is about to spike and changes are much bigger than thought initially.

All equations of the form  form straight lines when plotted semi-logarithmically, since taking logs of both sides gives

This is a line with slope  and  vertical intercept.  The logarithmic scale is usually labeled in base 10; occasionally in base 2:

A log–linear (sometimes log–lin) plot has the logarithmic scale on the y-axis, and a linear scale on the x-axis; a linear-log (sometimes lin–log) is the opposite. The naming is output-input (y-x), the opposite order from (x, y).

On a semi-log plot the spacing of the scale on the y-axis (or x-axis) is proportional to the logarithm of the number, not the number itself. It is equivalent to converting the y values (or x values) to their log, and plotting the data on linear scales. A log–log plot uses the logarithmic scale for both axes, and hence is not a semi-log plot.

Equations
The equation of a line on a linear-log plot, where the abscissa axis is scaled logarithmically (with a logarithmic base of n), would be

The equation for a line on a log–linear plot, with an ordinate axis logarithmically scaled (with a logarithmic base of n), would be:

Finding the function from the semi–log plot

Linear-log plot
On a linear-log plot, pick some fixed point (x0, F0), where F0 is shorthand for F(x0), somewhere on the straight line in the above graph, and further some other arbitrary point (x1, F1) on the same graph. The slope formula of the plot is:

 

which leads to

 

or

 

which means that
 

In other words, F is proportional to the logarithm of x times the slope of the straight line of its lin–log graph, plus a constant. Specifically, a straight line on a lin–log plot containing points (F0, x0) and (F1, x1) will have the function:

log–linear plot
On a log–linear plot (logarithmic scale on the y-axis), pick some fixed point (x0, F0), where F0 is shorthand for F(x0), somewhere on the straight line in the above graph, and further some other arbitrary point (x1, F1) on the same graph. The slope formula of the plot is:

 

which leads to

 

Notice that nlogn(F1) = F1. Therefore, the logs can be inverted to find:

 

or

 

This can be generalized for any point, instead of just F1:

Real-world examples

Phase diagram of water
In physics and chemistry, a plot of logarithm of pressure against temperature can be used to illustrate the various phases of a substance, as in the following for water:

2009 "swine flu" progression
While ten is the most common base, there are times when other bases are more appropriate, as in this example:

Microbial growth
In biology and biological engineering, the change in numbers of microbes due to asexual reproduction and nutrient exhaustion is commonly illustrated by a semi-log plot. Time is usually the independent axis, with the logarithm of the number or mass of bacteria or other microbe as the dependent variable. This forms a plot with four distinct phases, as shown below.

See also
 Nomograph, more complicated graphs
 Nonlinear regression#Transformation, for converting a nonlinear form to a semi-log form amenable to non-iterative calculation
 Log–log plot

References

Charts
Technical drawing
Statistical charts and diagrams
Non-Newtonian calculus